Harness Racing Victoria (HRV) is a statutory body for which the Victorian Minister for Racing, The Hon. Martin Pakula is responsible. Harness Racing Victoria's function is to administer, develop and promote the sport of Harness Racing in Victoria.

The HRV website says its mission is "to develop a vibrant Harness Racing industry that promotes participation, integrity and racing excellence, grows wagering and other revenue streams and maximises returns to its stakeholders."

Structure

HRV is operated by a seven-member Board which reports to Martin Pakula, the State Minister for Racing.

It is managed by an Executive team comprising the Chief Executive, David Martin and seven General Managers each responsible for one of HRV's units.

Head office is situated within the RVL complex at Flemington Racecourse in Melbourne's north.

Tabcorp Park
Tabcorp Park opened a new racing complex at Melton, which incorporates a 1,000-metre track as well as a host of amenities such as restaurants, gaming machines, hotel accommodation and conference facilities. The Melton track has replaced the existing metropolitan track at Moonee Valley.

The bistro and gaming lounge was opened on 5 March 2009 while the first race was held on 5 July 2009. It was a VicBred 2YO Fillies Semi Final won by Lady Belladonna.

See also
Glossary of Australian and New Zealand punting
Harness racing
Harness racing in Australia

References

External links

Harness racing in Australia
Tabcorp Park